The 1939 Georgia Teachers Blue Tide football team represented the Georgia Teachers College—now known as Georgia Southern University—during the 1939 college football season. The team was led by Crook Smith in his 11th year as head coach.

Schedule

References

Georgia Teachers
Georgia Southern Eagles football seasons
Georgia Teachers Blue Tide football